Craig Conway is an English actor. Conway has appeared in a number of stage plays and television series in addition to his film work.

Personal life
Conway was born in South Shields, England.

He was married to actress Jill Halfpenny from 2007 to 2010. They have one child together.

Filmography
 1996 Our Friends in the North TV mini-series as Young Christopher Collins
 1997 Downtime as Hammy
 1999 Combat as The F.N.G.
 2002 Dog Soldiers as Male Camper
 2004 Vera Drake as Station Constable
 2005 Jack as Carjacker #1
 2005 Heatwave (TV) as Roy Abbot
 2005 The Descent as Scar, Crawler
 2006 Terry Pratchett's Hogfather (TV) as "Chickenwire"
 2008 Doomsday as Sol
 2008 Romans 12:20 as Malky
 2009 The Tournament as Steve Tomko
 2010 Devil's Playground as Steve
 2010 The 4th Reich as Private Smith
 2011 Four as Husband
 2011 7 Lives as Keith
 2011 How to Stop Being a Loser as Ampersand
 2012 Airborne as Luke
 2013 The Dumping Ground as Bomb Squad Officer
 2014 The Hybrid as Mason
 2018 Mara as Dougie
 2018 Final Score as Viktor
 2019 The Courier as Agent Parlow
 2021 Doctors as Tony Scott

References

External links
 

Living people
English male film actors
English male stage actors
People from South Shields
Male actors from Tyne and Wear
Actors from County Durham
Year of birth missing (living people)